Sudan competed at the 2007 All-Africa Games held in Algiers, Algeria. The country won three gold medals and one bronze medal, all in athletics.

Medal summary

Medal table

Athletics 

Sudan won three gold medals and one bronze medal in athletics.

References 

Nations at the 2007 All-Africa Games
2007
All-Africa Games